The 2019 Annual King's Cup Football Tournament, commonly referred to as 2019 King's Cup, was the 47th King's Cup, the annual international men's football tournament organised by Football Association of Thailand. It was held in Buriram, Thailand, from 5 to 8 June 2019. Two matches were held on 5 June, the winners of which qualified for the final. The two other teams played the play-off for the 3rd spot.

As hosts, Thailand participated automatically in the tournament; they were joined by the CONCACAF team Curaçao and AFC teams Vietnam and India.

Defending champions Slovakia did not participate.

Participating teams 
The following teams have participated for the tournament.

 1 FIFA Ranking as of 4 April 2019.
 2 Curaçao replaced El Salvador which withdrew from the tournament. El Salvador themselves replaced China which initially planned to enter the tournament.

Venue 
All matches held at the Chang Arena in Buriram, Thailand.

Squads

Matches 
All times are local, Indochina Time (UTC+7)

Match rules 
 90 minutes.
 Penalty shoot-out after a draw in 90 minutes.
 Maximum of three substitutions.

Bracket

Semi-finals

Third place play-off

Final

Winners

Final ranking

Broadcasting rights

References

External links 
 Football Association of Thailand – FAT official site
 Football Association of Thailand – FIFA site
 Regulations Governing International Matches 
2019 King's Cup at RSSSF

King's Cup
King's Cup
King's Cup
King's Cup
Sports competitions in Bangkok